Na Meo is a rural commune on the border with Laos in Quan Sơn District, Thanh Hóa Province, Vietnam. It lies not far from Nam Xoi, Sam Neua in Laos.

It is often referred to as the Na Maew-Nam Xoi border crossing.

Populated places in Thanh Hóa province
Laos–Vietnam border crossings